The Queen's Necklace (French: Le collier de la reine) is a 1929 French historical drama film directed by Tony Lekain and Gaston Ravel and starring Marcelle Chantal, Georges Lannes and Diana Karenne. The film is an adaptation of Alexandre Dumas's novel The Queen's Necklace  which portrays the Affair of the Diamond Necklace which occurred before the French Revolution. The film's art direction was by Lucien Carré. The film was made and distributed by Gaumont. In Germany it was released by the major studio UFA.

It was shot as a silent film, with a music soundtrack then added later.

Cast
 Marcelle Chantal as La comtesse de la Motte  
 Georges Lannes as Le cardinal de Rohan 
 Diana Karenne as Marie-Antoinette / Oliva  
 Jeanne Evrard as La princesse de Lamballe 
 Jean Weber as Le chevalier Réteau de Villette  
 Renée Parme as Madame Élisabeth  
 Fernand Fabre as Le comte de La Motte  
 Harry Harment as Louis XVI  
 Odette Talazac as Madame de Misezy  
 Jules Mondos as Le joaillier  
 Gaston Mauger as Monsieur de Crosne  
 Paul Sato as Toussaint de Beauvire  
 Henri Lesieur as L'autre joaillier  
 Ady Cresso as Madame Vigée-Lebrun 
 Marc Dantzer   
 Jean Fay
 Marco Monti   
 Gilberte Savary   
 Emilio Vardannes

References

Bibliography 
 Klossner, Michael. The Europe of 1500-1815 on Film and Television: A Worldwide Filmography of Over 2550 Works, 1895 Through 2000. McFarland, 2002.

External links 
 

1929 films
1920s historical drama films
French historical drama films
1920s French-language films
Films based on works by Alexandre Dumas
Films directed by Gaston Ravel
Films set in the 18th century
Gaumont Film Company films
Transitional sound films
Works about the Affair of the Diamond Necklace
Films about Marie Antoinette
Cultural depictions of Louis XVI
1929 drama films
1920s French films